Amanita farinosa, commonly known as the Eastern American floury amanita or the American floury amanita, is a North American poisonous mushroom of the genus Amanita, a genus of fungi including some of the most deadly mushrooms.

Taxonomy
Two recent molecular studies show that Amanita farinosa is part of a subgroup within Amanita with its close relatives Amanita muscaria, A. gemmata and A. roseotincta.

Description
The cap is 2.5–7 cm (1–2.8 inches) in diameter, domed in young and flat in older specimens, with a striate margin. It is whitish grey and covered with brownish grey volval or mealy material. The gills are white. They may be attached to the stem or free. They are close and crowded and not bruising. The stem, or the stipe, lacks a ring and at its base a smallish bulb or volva. It measures up to 6.5 cm high, 1–3 centimeters thick. The stem is white to tan in color. The spores are white. They are 5.5–8 x 6–8 µm in measurement and inamyloid. The spores are smooth and round to broadly elliptical. The flesh is white in color. It doesn't stain on exposure. In old specimens, the smell can be strong and that of mink.

Distribution and habitat
An uncommon mushroom, it is found across North America in late summer to late autumn in coniferous or deciduous woodlands.

See also
List of Amanita species

Footnotes

farinosa
Poisonous fungi
Fungi of North America
Fungi of Central America
Fungi of Mexico
Fungi described in 1822
Fungi without expected TNC conservation status